Adriano Bernardini (born 13 August 1942) is an Italian prelate of the Catholic Church who occupied positions in the diplomatic service of the Holy See from the 1970s until he retired in 2017. His first assignment as Apostolic Nuncio was to Bangladesh (1992–1995) and his last to Italy (2011–2017). He has been an archbishop since 1992.

Biography
On 31 March 1968, he was ordained a priest for the Diocese of Rome by Cardinal Egidio Cardinal Vagnozzi. He attended the Pontifical Ecclesiastical Academy to study diplomacy and earn a doctorate in canon law.

His first assignment in the diplomatic service of the Holy See was in the Apostolic Nunciature to Pakistan, which also follows events in Afghanistan. He later worked in the nunciatures to Angola, Japan, Venezuela and Spain. On 17 January 1989 he was appointed chargé d'affaires of the nunciature in Taiwan. On 20 August 1992, just days after his 50th birthday, he was appointed Titular Archbishop of Falerii and Apostolic Nuncio to Bangladesh. He received his episcopal consecration on 15 November 1992 from Cardinal Angelo Sodano.

Bernardini remained in Bangladesh until 15 June 1996, when he was appointed Apostolic Nuncio to Madagascar, Mauritius and the Seychelles. He was next appointed Nuncio to Thailand, Singapore and Cambodia and Apostolic Delegate to Burma, Laos, Malaysia and Brunei on 24 July 1999. Pope John Paul II named him Apostolic Nuncio to Argentina on 26 April 2003. His years there were marked by sharp differences between the Argentine bishops, notably Cardinal Jorge Bergoglio (later Pope Francis), and Bernardini as representative of Secretary of State Cardinal Angelo Sodano.

Pope Benedict XVI named him Nuncio to Italy and San Marino on 15 November 2011. In 2014, he conducted an investigation into charges of scandalous behavior by priests in the Diocese of Albenga-Imperia, which led to further investigation and the removal of a bishop. His career in the diplomatic service ended on 12 September 2017, when he was replaced as Nuncio to Italy by the first non-Italian to hold the position since Italy and the Holy See established full diplomatic ties in 1929.

On 4 October 2017, Pope Francis named him a member of the Congregation for the Evangelization of Peoples.

See also
 List of heads of the diplomatic missions of the Holy See

References

1942 births
20th-century Italian Roman Catholic titular archbishops
21st-century Italian Roman Catholic titular archbishops
Pontifical Ecclesiastical Academy alumni
Living people
Apostolic Nuncios to Seychelles
Apostolic Nuncios to Argentina
Apostolic Nuncios to Madagascar
Apostolic Nuncios to Mauritius
Apostolic Nuncios to Italy
Apostolic Nuncios to Thailand
Apostolic Nuncios to Singapore
Apostolic Nuncios to Cambodia
Apostolic Nuncios to Bangladesh
Apostolic Nuncios to Myanmar
Apostolic Nuncios to Malaysia	
Apostolic Nuncios to Laos